

Results

Scottish Premier Division

Final standings

Scottish League Cup

Group stage

Group 2 final table

Knockout stage

Scottish Cup

Anglo-Scottish Cup

References

 

Aberdeen F.C. seasons
Aberdeen
Aberdeen